Crossocheilus latius, also known as the stone roller or Gangetic latia, is a species of ray-finned fish in the genus Crossocheilus. It is found in India, Bangladesh, Myanmar, Nepal, and China.

References

Crossocheilus
Fish described in 1822
Taxobox binomials not recognized by IUCN